Best of 3X Krazy, Vol. 2 is the second compilation released by 3X Krazy.  It was released on March 26, 2002 for Sneak Records and was a sequel to the group's previous compilation, 20th Century.

Track listing
"Somethin' 4 Dat Ass"- 4:08
"Sick-O"- 5:53
"Hoe Fuckin' Season"- 4:33
"Put Me to the Test"- 6:17
"Sunshine in the O"- 5:11
"In the Town"- 5:05
"Can't Fuck With This"- 5:31
"Open Your Eyes"- 4:09
"West Coast Shit"- 4:13
"Pistols Blazin"- 6:09
"Hit the Gas"- 5:05
"Ghetto Soldiers"- 4:54
"Get'em"- 5:03
"Tired of the Pain"- 4:54

References

2002 compilation albums
3X Krazy albums
Albums produced by Bosko
Gangsta rap compilation albums